The Port of Tillamook Bay Railroad (POTB) was a  shortline railroad in northwestern Oregon in the United States. Purchased from the Southern Pacific Transportation Company in 1990 by the Port of Tillamook Bay, the railroad was used to transport lumber and agricultural products over the Northern Oregon Coast Range between the Oregon Coast and the Portland area until heavily damaged in a 2007 storm. The Port of Tillamook Bay began operating the unincorporated railroad on March 27, 1986, but the tracks were originally constructed by Oregon judge George R. Bagley and others in 1906. The railroad's main line, no longer in use due to storm damage, runs between Hillsboro and Tillamook.

History
The predecessor to the Port of Tillamook Bay Railroad was a line built by the Pacific Railway and Navigation Company between 1906 and 1911. The line, whose reporting mark was "PR&N", was sometimes known as the "Punk, Rotten, and Nasty" because of the wet and muddy working conditions for crews building the railroad through the Coast Range. The line became the Tillamook Branch Line of the Southern Pacific Railroad in 1916.

Storms
In January 1990, the railroad was significantly damaged by a storm, and the cost of repairs was about $1.3 million. In February 1990, after having leased the railroad, the Port of Tillamook Bay purchased it from the Southern Pacific Transportation Company for nearly $2.9 million.

In February 1996, more storms damaged the Hillsboro–Tillamook line. About  of line was "nearly completely destroyed", two bridges washed out, and the flooding Salmonberry River washed "boulders the size of cars" through one of the line's tunnels. A preliminary estimate of the damage, given by the Oregon Department of Transportation, was $5 million. In March, Oregon governor John Kitzhaber, convinced that repairing the railroad would not harm steelhead runs, permitted repairs to continue through the end of the month. In June, the state determined that the Port of Tillamook Bay had violated state environmental laws, such as by failing to control erosion in the Salmonberry River canyon.

During a storm on December 2 and 3, 2007, known as the Great Coastal Gale, the railroad was again significantly damaged in the Salmonberry River canyon. The cost of repairs to the railroad was first estimated at $20 million. Tillamook County logging companies faced increased costs because they had to transport timber by truck. When the repair cost estimate was revised to $57.3 million, fisheries groups suggested permanently abandoning the railroad because they thought "that economically, the railroad is not viable, and environmentally, rebuilding it would affect fish runs already hammered by last winter's storms". Workers began assessing the railroad damage in February 2008 in snowy, rugged terrain, and found that the flooding Salmonberry River had eroded steep embankments, damaging tunnels and collapsing trestles and bridges. Later that year, they hiked as far as  each day to the canyon to further assess the damage. The port also leases a  section of track from Banks to Hillsboro to the Portland and Western Railroad and leases the coastal portion of the line to the Oregon Coast Scenic Railroad.

Oregon Coast Scenic Railroad
The Oregon Coast Scenic Railroad (OCSR), a non-profit museum group, operates a heritage railroad in conjunction with the POTB that runs tourist trains on a portion of POTB track from Garibaldi north to Rockaway Beach. as well as various excursions from Wheeler to Batterson, Oregon. As of 2011, OCSR was negotiating a contract with the port commission to perform track maintenance in exchange for controlling the scheduling along the portion of the line. There is disagreement between the port authority and OCSR about the percentage of ticket revenues to be paid to POTB. OCSR wanted an agreement with POTB as assurance that if the scenic railroad invests $30,000 to $40,000 in a building to house a new, larger train engine, that the tracks would not be used for another purpose. Meanwhile, the port commission said it had received an offer of more than $4 million to sell the railroad for scrap, an amount that would pay off the nearly $1.7 million in debts the port has accrued on the railroad. A former port commissioner speaking on behalf of OCSR believed, however, that the port would have trouble gaining federal approval to completely abandon the rail line.

In March 2012, OCSR agreed to lease from POTB  of line from the Salmonberry River to Tillamook. This would effectively make the entire line a tourist railroad. OCSR plans to extend services to Tillamook as soon as practicable, with extension to the north a future possibility.

See also
Salmonberry Trail

References

External links

Photos of the railroad from Flickr
Port of Tillamook Bay National Register of Historic Places Evaluation

1986 establishments in Oregon
Logging railroads in the United States
Oregon railroads
Railway lines opened in 1986
Transportation in Tillamook County, Oregon
Transportation in Washington County, Oregon